KFSM may refer to:

 KFSM-TV, a television station (channel 5 analog/18 digital) licensed to Fort Smith, Arkansas, United States
 the ICAO code for Fort Smith Regional Airport